Hoseynabad (also Romanized as Ḩoseynābād) is a village in the Central District of Khur and Biabanak County, Isfahan Province, Iran. At the 2006 census, its population was 36, in 11 families.

References 

Populated places in Khur and Biabanak County